WJAA (96.3 FM) is a radio station broadcasting an album oriented rock format. Licensed to Austin, Indiana, United States, the station is currently owned by Rebecca and Brent Schepman, through licensee Social Butterfly Media, LLC., and features programming from Motor Racing Network.

References

External links

JAA